The 1993 Minnesota Twins finished with a 71–91 record, leaving the team tied for fifth place with the California Angels.  Kirby Puckett won the All-Star MVP award on July 13 and St. Paul native Dave Winfield got his 3,000th hit over the course of the year.

Offseason
 October 26, 1992: Mike Maksudian was selected off waivers by the Twins from the Toronto Blue Jays.
 December 4, 1992: Kirby Puckett, after testing the free agent waters, signed a 5-year $30 million contract to remain a Twin.  His deal is the second largest total package in major league history, topped only by the $32.5 million 5-year deal signed by Cal Ripken Jr. with the Baltimore Orioles last August.
 December 5, 1992: David West was traded by the Twins to the Philadelphia Phillies for Mike Hartley.
 December 9, 1992: Jim Deshaies was signed as a free agent by the Twins.
 December 17, 1992: Dave Winfield was signed as a free agent by the Twins.
 January 8, 1993: Randy Bush was signed as a free agent by the Twins.

Regular season
At Oriole Park at Camden Yards, the Twins' All-Star representatives were outfielder Kirby Puckett and closer Rick Aguilera.  Puckett was named the MVP following his 2-for-3 performance with a solo home run and a run-scoring double.
On September 16, Dave Winfield collected his 3000th major league hit, a run-scoring 9th-inning single off Oakland's Dennis Eckersley.  Winfield was the first to do so wearing a Twins uniform, and the first ever to do so indoors.
The highest paid Twin in 1993 was Puckett at $5,300,000, followed by Hrbek at $3,100,000.

Offense

Not only did Winfield get his 3,000th hit, but he also got his 500th double and 450th homer.  He had a serviceable year as the team's primary designated hitter, hitting .271 with 21 home runs and 76 RBI.  Other offensive highlights included Kent Hrbek becoming the second Twin (along with Harmon Killebrew) to reach 1,000 RBI and Brian Harper becoming only the fourth catcher in the prior 40 years to hit .300 in three consecutive seasons.  Chuck Knoblauch continued his solid leadoff hitting, batting .277 and stealing a team-leading 29 bases.  The weaker spots in the regular lineup included Pedro Muñoz (.233 average).

Pitching

The starting rotation was reasonably competent, with Kevin Tapani, Willie Banks, and Jim Deshaies having ERAs in the low fours.  Unfortunately, Scott Erickson was not able to follow up his very successful first three years in the majors, posting an ERA of 5.19 and leading the majors in losses (19).  The fifth spot in the rotation was uncertain, with Eddie Guardado making 16 starts and Mike Trombley 10.

There were strong pitchers in the bullpen, starting with closer Rick Aguilera.  He had 34 saves, and was American League Pitcher of the Month for June.  Also having strong years were Larry Casian with an ERA of 3.02, Mike Hartley (4.00), and Carl Willis (3.10).  This was not so much the case for pitchers such as George Tsamis (6.19) and Brett Merriman (9.67).

Defense

The team was strong defensively.  Harper was a strong catcher, with a .988 fielding percentage.  Hrbek was always strong at first base as well, making only five errors in 1993.  Knoblauch was a good second baseman at this point in his career.  Mike Pagliarulo played in about half the team's games at third, with reasonable competence.  (Jeff Reboulet and Terry Jorgensen also saw time at the position.)  The team intended Scott Leius to be the starting shortstop, but an early injury prevented this from occurring.  It paved the way for Pat Meares to man the position for several years.  He surprised the team by playing reasonably well during his rookie year.  Puckett always excelled in center field, while Shane Mack and Munoz did okay on either side of him.

Season standings

Record vs. opponents

Notable transactions
 June 3, 1993: 1993 Major League Baseball draft
Torii Hunter was drafted by the Twins in the 1st round (20th pick).
Jason Varitek was drafted by the Twins in the 1st round (21st pick), but did not sign.
Dan Perkins was drafted by the Twins in the 2nd round.
Javier Valentín was drafted by the Twins in the 3rd round.
 June 27, 1993: Randy Bush was released by the Twins.
 June 30, 1993: Alan Newman and minor leaguer Tom Hauk were traded to the Cincinnati Reds for Gary Scott.
 August 15, 1993: Mike Pagliarulo was traded by the Twins to the Baltimore Orioles for a player to be named later.  On August 16, the Orioles sent Erik Schullstrom to the Twins to complete the trade.
 August 28, 1993: Jim Deshaies was traded by the Twins to the San Francisco Giants for Aaron Fultz, minor leaguer Andres Duncan, and a player to be named later. On September 1, the Giants sent Greg Brummett to the Twins to complete the trade.

Roster

Player stats

Batting

Starters by position
Note: Pos = Position; G = Games played; AB = At bats; H = Hits; Avg. = Batting average; HR = Home runs; RBI = Runs batted in

Other batters
Note: G = Games played; AB = At bats; H = Hits; Avg. = Batting average; HR = Home runs; RBI = Runs batted in

Pitching

Starting pitchers
Note: G = Games pitched; IP = Innings pitched; W = Wins; L = Losses; ERA = Earned run average; SO = Strikeouts

Other pitchers
Note: G = Games pitched; IP = Innings pitched; W = Wins; L = Losses; ERA = Earned run average; SO = Strikeouts

Relief pitchers
Note: G = Games pitched; W = Wins; L = Losses; SV = Saves; ERA = Earned run average; SO = Strikeouts

Other post-season awards
Calvin R. Griffith Award (Most Valuable Twin) – Brian Harper
Joseph W. Haynes Award (Twins Pitcher of the Year) – Rick Aguilera
Bill Boni Award (Twins Outstanding Rookie) – Pat Meares
Charles O. Johnson Award (Most Improved Twin) – Larry Casian
Dick Siebert Award (Upper Midwest Player of the Year) – Paul Molitor
The above awards are voted on by the Twin Cities chapter of the BBWAA
Carl R. Pohlad Award (Outstanding Community Service) – Brian Harper
Sherry Robertson Award (Twins Outstanding Farm System Player) – LaTroy Hawkins

Kirby Puckett won the Branch Rickey Award, given annually to an individual in Major League Baseball (MLB) in recognition of his exceptional community service.  The award was inaugurated last year and was awarded to Toronto Blue Jay Dave Winfield.  In 1998, Paul Molitor becomes the second Twin to win the award.

Farm system

References

External links
Player stats from www.baseball-reference.com
Team info from www.baseball-almanac.com
Twins history through the 1990s, from www.mlb.com
1993 Standings

Minnesota Twins seasons
Minnesota Twins
Twins